Recollections of a Bleeding Heart: A Portrait of Paul Keating PM is a non-fiction political book, by Don Watson. It won The Age Book of the Year.

It is his account of the prime ministership of Australia of Paul Keating.

Reviews
"Review of Don Watson, Recollections of a Bleeding Heart: A Portrait of Paul Keating PM.", Australian Journal of Political Science, September 2002

Bibliography
Recollections of a bleeding heart: a portrait of Paul Keating PM, Knopf, 2002, ; Random House Australia, 2008,

References

External links
http://www.jewishaustralia.com/donwatsonbook.htm

2002 non-fiction books